Muenster is a city in western Cooke County, Texas, United States, along U.S. Route 82. The population was 1,544 at the 2010 census. Muenster is a primarily German-Texan and Catholic city.

History

In 1887, the Missouri–Kansas–Texas Railroad constructed a line from Gainesville to Henrietta that passed through the site that would become Muenster. The town was subsequently founded in 1889 by German Catholic settlers Carl and Emil Flusche, who invited other German Catholics to join them. The town was originally to be called "Westphalia", but since the name Westphalia, Texas, was already taken, Muenster was selected instead in honor of Münster, the capital of Westphalia, but these cities are not sister-cities.

Many residents still spoke German in day-to-day life up until the First World War, after which the language was no longer taught in the schools and steadily declined in use.

With more than 90% of the population German and Catholic, the city has preserved many German customs, and still produces traditional foods at the local meat market and Bäckerei. An annual festival in April, Germanfest, includes beer, BBQ, German food, music, and bike and footraces. A Christkindlmarkt is held each year on Thanksgiving weekend.

Catholicism was so important to the early settlers that they built a school before a church was ever established. That school, Sacred Heart Catholic School, still exists today (one of only four high schools in the Fort Worth Diocese), along with the public Muenster Independent School District.

Geography

Demographics

2020 census

As of the 2020 United States census, there were 1,536 people, 525 households, and 330 families residing in the city.

2000 census
As of the census of 2000, 1,556 people, 588 households, and 401 families resided in the city. The population density was 1,209.3 people per square mile (465.7/km2). The 628 housing units averaged 488.1 per square mile (188.0/km2). The racial makeup of the city was 97.62% White, 0.13% Native American, 0.51% Asian, 0.71% from other races, and 1.03% from two or more races. About  2.19% of the population was Hispanic or Latino of any race.

Of the 588 households, 35.5% had children under the age of 18 living with them, 57.1% were married couples living together, 7.7% had a female householder with no husband present, and 31.8% were not families. Around 28.9% of all households were made up of individuals, and 17.7% had someone living alone who was 65 years of age or older. The average household size was 2.57 and the average family size was 3.20.

In the city, the population was distributed as 29.5% under the age of 18, 6.0% from 18 to 24, 26.9% from 25 to 44, 18.3% from 45 to 64, and 19.3% who were 65 years of age or older. The median age was 37 years. For every 100 females, there were 88.1 males. For every 100 females age 18 and over, there were 83.8 males.

The median income for a household in the city was $39,125, and for a family was $48,000. Males had a median income of $29,688 versus $22,697 for females. The per capita income for the city was $20,638. About 4.3% of families and 5.4% of the population were below the poverty line, including 5.7% of those under age 18 and 8.1% of those age 65 or over.

Notable people

 Augustine Danglmayr, Auxiliary Bishop of the Roman Catholic Diocese of Dallas, was born in Muenster  
 Dean L. Sicking, inventor and traffic safety researcher
 Drew Springer, District 30’s senator and lives in Muenster

Climate
The climate in this area is characterized by hot, humid summers and generally mild to cool winters.  According to the Köppen climate classification system, Muenster has a humid subtropical climate, Cfa on climate maps.

References

External links

 City of Muenster official website
 

Cities in Cooke County, Texas
Cities in Texas
German-American history